Gabriella Juhász (born 19 March 1985 in Kisvárda) is a retired Hungarian handballer.

Juhász made her international debut on 3 March 2007 against Norway, and participated on the 2009 World Championship.

Achievements
Nemzeti Bajnokság I:
Winner: 2005, 2006
Silver Medallist: 2004, 2007, 2010, 2011
Bronze Medallist: 2008
Magyar Kupa:
Winner: 2005, 2006, 2007
Silver Medallist: 2004, 2011
Liga Naţională:
Silver Medallist: 2009
EHF Champions League:
Semifinalist: 2007
EHF Women's Cup Winners' Cup:
Finalist: 2006
EHF Cup:
Finalist: 2004, 2005
Norwegian League
Bronze: 2017/2018
Norwegian Cup:
Finalist: 2018, 2019

References 

1985 births
Living people
People from Kisvárda
Hungarian female handball players
Győri Audi ETO KC players
Hungarian expatriate sportspeople in Romania
Sportspeople from Szabolcs-Szatmár-Bereg County